The French tricolore is the official national flag used in the Collectivity of Saint Martin.

Other flags

An unofficial flag is used by the local government, which depicts the island's coat of arms on a white field.

Another unofficial flag that was used depicted a modern logotype, containing the name "Saint-Martin", with "Caraïbe Française" and "French Caribbean" written in small text below. Also on the flag was a ribbon depicting the letters "S" (in blue) and "M" (in green) for Saint Martin.

See also
 Coat of arms of the Collectivity of Saint Martin
 Flag of Sint Maarten

References

External links
 

Flags of Overseas France
Flag